Tai Si (c. 12th – 11th century BC) was the wife of King Wen of Zhou and is revered as a highly respected woman of ancient China.  She was a descendant of Yu the Great - founder of the Xia Dynasty - and was the mother of ten sons, including King Wu of Zhou - founder of the Zhou Dynasty - and his younger brother the Duke of Zhou.

Particularly respected by Wu Zetian, China's only Empress regnant, Tai Si and King Wen were posthumously given the temple names "Shizu" in 690 AD.

Life
Tai Si is said to be born in the Youxin clan of the ancestral name Si, from what is now Heyang County, Shaanxi Province.  Han Dynasty historian Sima Qian wrote that she was originally from the older State of Qi or State of Zeng, both in and around modern-day Henan Province.

The traditional story regarding Tai Si's rise to queen says that the future King Wen of Zhou, born Chang, was walking along the banks of the Wei River one day when he first met Tai Si.  Her beauty so captivated Chang that he initially thought she was a goddess or angel.  Tai Si proved a woman of benevolence, wisdom, and simple tastes, and Chang decided to take her as his wife.  Because the Wei River was not bridged, Chang set out to build one by constructing a number of boats that were arranged end-to-end to form a floating path across the river.  Tai Si was impressed, and they were married.

After Tai Si joined her husband's family, she is said to have quickly gained favor with the other women of the royal family through her diligent work ethic and demeanor.  She and the king had ten sons together, and Tai Si is said to have been an exceptional teacher and mother, such that all of the sons were men of upright virtue and wisdom.

In literature
Guan Ju, the famous opening song of the Book of Songs, with its opening description of a beautiful maiden plucking plants along a river bank who is loved by a young prince, is said by some to be originally about Tai Si and the prince's first meeting along the Wei River.

References

Ancient Chinese women
11th-century BC Chinese people
11th-century BC women
Zhou dynasty nobility
Shang dynasty people